Kalman Kohn Bistritz was a Hungarian maskilic poet and epigrammatist, who lived at the beginning of the nineteenth century. He was the author of the Purim drama Goral ha-tzaddikim ('The Lot of the Righteous'), which appeared in Vienna in 1821. He belonged to the same family as Meir Kohn Bistritz.

References
 

19th-century Hungarian Jews
19th-century Hungarian male writers
19th-century Hungarian poets
Hebrew-language playwrights
Hebrew-language poets
Jewish poets